Mariano Puerta and Javier Sánchez were the defending champions, but Sánchez did not compete this year, as he played his last professional tournament at Bogotá before his retirement during this season. Puerta teamed up with Marcelo Ríos and withdrew before their semifinals match to focus on the singles tournament, as both players reached the final.

Álex López Morón and Albert Portas won the title by defeating Ivan Ljubičić and Lovro Zovko 6–1, 3–6, 6–3 in the final.

Seeds

Draw

Draw

References

External links
 Official results archive (ATP)
 Official results archive (ITF)

Croatia Open - Doubles
2000 Singles
2000 in Croatian tennis